Sambalpur City railway station is a railway station in the outskirts of Sambalpur on the East Coast Railway network in the state of Odisha, India. It serves Sambalpur city. Its code is SBPY. Passenger, Express and Superfast trains halt at Sambalpur City railway station.

Major trains

 Rourkela–Gunupur Rajya Rani Express
 Bokaro Steel City–Bhubaneswar Garib Rath Express
 Valsad–Puri Superfast Express
 Indore–Puri Humsafar Express
 Rourkela–Bhubaneswar Intercity Express
 Bhubaneswar–Anand Vihar Weekly Superfast Express
 Bhubaneswar Rajdhani Express

See also
 Sambalpur district

References

Railway stations in Sambalpur district
Sambalpur railway division